Tom Richardson (born October 15, 1944) is a former NFL football player with the Boston Patriots during the 1970s, as a wide receiver.

External links

Jackson State Tigers football players
Boston Patriots players
Living people
1944 births
People from Greenville, Mississippi